XHA-FM (94.5 MHz, La Invasora 94.5), is a commercial radio station licensed in Tijuana, Baja California, Mexico. It is owned and operated by Uniradio and plays Regional Mexican music. The station carries similar programming to sister station 99.7 XHTY-FM.

History
XHA was the original XHTY-FM. The station signed on the air on July 20, 1979, after receiving its concession.  Originally it was powered at only 1,600 watts, with its signal confined to Tijuana and a few American neighborhoods along the border.  It later got a boost to its current 20,000 watts, giving it a signal that covers all of Tijuana and its suburbs as well as San Diego.

In 1999, it became XHA-FM. The XHTY call sign moved to 99.7, which had previously been XHAMR-FM. The move accompanied a format swap between the stations.

External links
Invasora 94.5 official website

References

Radio stations in Tijuana